is a Japanese footballer currently playing as a forward for Iwate Grulla Morioka.

Career statistics

Club
''Updated to January 1st, 2022.

Notes

References

External links

1997 births
Living people
Association football people from Chiba Prefecture
Tokyo Gakugei University alumni
Japanese footballers
Association football forwards
J3 League players
Kashima Antlers players
Iwate Grulla Morioka players